Sir John Fleet (1648 – 6 July 1712) was an English merchant who served as Lord Mayor, Sheriff and MP for London.

He was born the son of innkeeper Richard Fleet of Bourton, Buckinghamshire and entered the London cooping trade, progressing later to setting himself up as a sugar merchant. In 1689 he was elected Master of the Coopers' company, in 1693 Master of the Grocers' company and in 1688 an alderman of the City of London. He was elected Sheriff of London for the year 1688-89 and in 1692 elected Lord Mayor of London. He was knighted in 1688.

In 1693, he entered politics as the Member of Parliament for the City of London (until 1700) and was then returned again for the same seat in 1701 and 1702 (until 1705).

He died in 1712 and was buried at St Mary's Church, Battersea, London. He had married twice: firstly Elizabeth Arnold of St. Andrew, Holborn, Middlesex and secondly the widow of Thomas Newcombe, the royal printer, with whom he had three sons (one surviving) and four daughters.

References

1648 births
1712 deaths
People from Buckinghamshire
17th-century lord mayors of London
Sheriffs of the City of London
Members of the Parliament of England for the City of London
English MPs 1690–1695
English MPs 1695–1698
English MPs 1698–1700
English MPs 1701
English MPs 1702–1705